Rosemary L. Moynihan (born February 15, 1943) is an American politician.

Moynihan lived in East Hartford, Connecticut. She was a member of the advisory council of the
Connecticut State University Center for Educational Excellence until December 1989, when she was appointed to the university's board of regents. She resigned from the board of regents on December 4, 1990, upon her election to the Connecticut House of Representatives as a Democrat. She was elected to the state house from the 10th district, and served through 1993. Moynihan was succeeded in office by Melody Currey.

Her husband was Timothy Moynihan who also served in the Connecticut General Assembly.

Notes

1943 births
Living people
People from East Hartford, Connecticut
Women state legislators in Connecticut
Democratic Party members of the Connecticut House of Representatives
20th-century American women politicians
20th-century American politicians
Spouses of Connecticut politicians
21st-century American women